Styled to Rock is a British reality television series on Sky Living, executive produced by Barbadian recording artist Rihanna which focuses on fashion design. The contestants compete with each other to create the best outfit for one or more famous music acts every week. They are restricted in time and materials. Their designs are judged and the music act of the week chooses his favorite one. One designer is eliminated each week.

On 25 October 2013, The United States version of Styled to Rock premiered on Bravo.

Format
Similar to the American series Project Runway, hosted by German top model Heidi Klum, the British series is also looking for new designers to create fashion for A-list celebrities in the world. Supported by their mentors, the candidates who were chosen as well as the mentors all by Rihanna personally, fight in a ten-week battle for the final. Weekly the candidates design outfits for one ore more music celebrities. Normally the celebrities select the winners outfit by themselves. So every week there is a winner, but also two candidates who have to assert themselves in conversation again, until finally the worst of the week will be suspended. In the final, the two best designers fight to create an outfit for Rihanna herself which she wore during her performance at the Wireless Festival on 8 July 2012.

The reason why Rihanna wanted to run this format just in the United Kingdom and especially in London, she told in the introduction of the first episode. She said that in London the "children of the street" have a unique street style, which can/has inspired numerous designers. Because these people can't show their talent easily, Rihanna wanted to give them a chance to get the attention they deserve. With the format also the candidates who have not managed in the show could eventually establish themselves independently in the fashion world through the hype and the media attention.

Overview
Styled to Rock premiered its first season on 14 August 2012 at 9 pm.

Mentors
The three mentors of the candidates were Nicola Roberts (British recording artist and entrepreneur), Henry Holland (British fashion designer, businessman and blogger) and Lysa Cooper (American celebrity stylist). The celebrities for which the candidates designed were Kanye West (not in show, Rihanna chose best outfit), Cheryl Cole, Katy Perry, The Saturdays, The Scissor Sisters, Pixie Lott, Rizzle Kicks, Tinchy Stryder, Little Mix and Little Boots.

Contestants
The 12 fashion designers competing in the first season were:

Challenges

 Green background and WINNER means the designer won Styled to Rock.
 Purple background and RUNNER-UP means the designer was the runner-up on Styled to Rock.
 Blue background and WIN means the designer won that challenge.
 Turquoise background and WIN means the designer won that intercalated challenge.
 Orange background and LOW means the designer was in the bottom two (or more), but was not eliminated.
 Red background and ELIM means the designer lost and was out of the competition.

Episodes

References

External links
 
 

2010s British reality television series
2012 British television series debuts
2012 British television series endings
Fashion-themed reality television series
Rihanna
Sky Living original programming
English-language television shows
Television series by Warner Bros. Television Studios